Eupterote udiana is a moth in the family Eupterotidae. It was described by Frederic Moore in 1860. It is found on Java in Indonesia.

References

Moths described in 1860
Eupterotinae